Azamat Arturovich Tuskaev (born 21 January 1994, in Chikola), is a Russian freestyle wrestler of Ossetian descent.  Tuskaev won his first Ivan Yarygin Gran Prix in 2020, which allowed him to enter the 2020 European Wrestling Championships held in Rome, Italy.  Tuskaev would wrestle at 57 kg and also win the gold medal - controlling and mostly dominating former European-champion and World Silver medalist Atli in the process.

Early life
Tuskaev originally wanted to become a professional football player; although, his dad took Tuskaev to start wrestling in his home of Chikola, seeing as Khadzhimurat Gatsalov, Boris Makoev and Amiran Kardanov had all started their wrestling careers in Chikola.  Thus began Tuskaev's career, where he has wrestled in tournaments such as:  European Championships, Sassari Ranking Series Tournament; World Cup; Russian National Championships and the Alania tournament.

References

1994 births
Living people
People from North Ossetia–Alania
Russian male sport wrestlers
European Wrestling Championships medalists
European Wrestling Champions
Sportspeople from North Ossetia–Alania